The Launch is a Canadian reality music competition series broadcast by CTV, which premiered on January 10, 2018.

Each episode of the series follows five emerging musicians competing for a chance to have a debut single released commercially. The series was described by its executive producer and lead mentor, Scott Borchetta, as being a contrast to other music competition formats such as American Idol, by being formatted as a self-contained program (rather than a long-term competition with viewer voting), and emphasizing the work of record producers in tailoring new songs to the prospective performers. The series also leverages the platforms of CTV's parent company Bell Media, including its radio stations, in order to promote its winners.

The series was renewed for a second season which aired on CTV between January and March 2019, and Bell sold international format rights to Sony Pictures Television.

Production 
In February 2017, Bell Media announced that it had partnered with Scott Borchetta, a record executive best known for developing Taylor Swift, to develop a new, international television format that would "uncover, develop, and promote pop culture's next musical superstars", and "leverage Bell Media's massive reach and extensive platforms to showcase musicians on the national and international stage." Bell Media officially announced the new series, The Launch, in April 2017, with a six-episode order for CTV to air in 2018. The season 1 order was later expanded with a follow-up episode focusing on the six winners.

In an interview with the Toronto Star, Borchetta contrasted The Launch to other reality music competition series such as American Idol (where he mentored during its fourteenth season) and The Voice, by emphasizing its focus on a song itself rather than just performers. He explained that "going 20-plus weeks seeing who gets voted in as the winner, then trying to figure out the song and producer, it just felt like we can do a better job with that much attention and that many sets of ears and eyes paying attention to the show."

Borchetta added that record producers had "a lot of great songs that just haven't had the right opportunity", such as Stephan Moccio, who supplied a song he had worked on whilst working on the soundtrack for Fifty Shades of Grey. Bell Media president and former Universal Music Canada head Randy Lennox (who has previously worked with Borchetta) described the pace of the format, where producers are given 48 hours to work with the two candidate musicians to record their debut single, as being "star-making machinery meets Kiefer Sutherland 24". The winners' songs receive additional production work in between the completion of episode production and their public release.

Over 10,000 applications were received for the first season; Borchetta explained that Canada had a large pool of untapped musical talent because there were no "opportunities" to kickstart their careers (unlike the U.S., whose talent had, in his opinion,  been "gone through over and over again" by competing programs), and noted that there was a sense of pride over domestic artists. He emphasized that the series "isn't about somebody that has never performed before getting a record deal; this is about an artist who's ready and just needs this big break. This is the big break." Bell Media's vertical integration is leveraged as an aspect of the series; the winning songs are featured on Bell Media Radio stations and the division's iHeartRadio service, and the series is also covered as part of other CTV programs.

On February 22, 2018, Bell Media sold international rights to the format to Sony Pictures Television; the company began to sell the first season of the Canadian version, and develop a British version through its production house Electric Ray. In May 2018, CTV announced that The Launch had been renewed for a second season.

Format 
During each episode, five musical acts audition for a panel of mentors (although due to time constraints, not all of the contestants are featured in the episode as broadcast on television). Two of the acts are selected to advance to the second phase of the competition, where they are given 48 hours to record their own versions of an original song, working with producers to adapt the song to suit their individual style. The contestants then perform their versions of the song in front of a live audience. After judging the recording and live performance, the mentors and Borchetta select a winner, whose song is "launched" through digital music services and stores after the airing of the episode.

Episodes

Season 1

Season 2

Reception 
Montreal Gazette media writer Steve Faguy gave the series premiere a positive review. He noted that The Launchs contrasting format to viewer-voted music competitions, as well as its focus on the production process of music, would make it appeal to viewers interested in a show focusing on artists and music. He felt that the contributions of Borchetta and other expert mentors gave the program authenticity, but that Borchetta was "stiff" as an on-camera personality. However, Faguy was critical of the premiere's featured song, "The Lucky Ones", describing it as being "catchy" but written "by committee", with "uninspiring" lyrics and "a melody that doesn't really set it apart from anything else you'll hear on Virgin Radio." He also criticized the decision to cut auditions from the airing episode for time constraints (although Bell defended the decision by noting that these contestants were still able to participate in promotion for the series, would be featured in supplemental digital content posted on the CTV website and YouTube, and that "director's cut" versions of each episode would be made available for streaming on CraveTV after their CTV broadcast). In conclusion, Faguy felt that The Launch "has some potential as a format that could be exportable elsewhere, despite its flaws."

"The Lucky Ones", the featured song in its series premiere, reached #1 on the iTunes Store sales chart in Canada following the episode's broadcast. "Ain't Easy" was the most successful song of the first season, reaching a Music Canada Platinum certification and being the only one to chart on the Billboard Canadian Hot 100.

Discography

EPs
2018: The Launch EP
2019: The Launch Season 2 EP

Singles

References

External links

2010s Canadian music television series
2010s Canadian reality television series
2018 Canadian television series debuts
CTV Television Network original programming
English-language television shows
Music competitions in Canada
Television series by Bell Media
Television series by Insight Productions
Television series by Sony Pictures Television
Television series by Eureka